Farleigh Hospice is a registered charity (no. 284670) which provides hospice care to people affected by life limiting illnesses across mid Essex. Since being established in 1982, the Hospice and its team of healthcare professionals, has grown and evolved to meet the changing needs of the community it serves.

External links
Farleigh Hospice
 

Hospices in England
Charities based in Essex
Health in Essex
Chelmsford
1982 establishments in England